St. John's City South is a parliamentary constituency in St. John's, Antigua and Barbuda.
In 2018, the constituency had 1,652 registered electors, up from 1,459 in 2014.

Voting trends

Members of Parliament

References 

Constituencies of Antigua and Barbuda
St. John's, Antigua and Barbuda